Same-sex marriage in the British Antarctic Territory has been legal since 13 October 2016. A new marriage ordinance bringing territorial legislation in line with the law in force in England and Wales was proclaimed by Commissioner Peter Hayes on 13 October, legalising marriage by same-sex couples in the British Antarctic Territory.

Background
In 1908, the United Kingdom declared sovereignty over South Georgia, the South Sandwich Islands, the South Shetland Islands, the South Orkney Islands and Graham Land. In 1917, the UK modified its claim, so as to include all the territory in the sector stretching to the South Pole. The territories were administered as Falkland Islands Dependencies. The British Antarctic Territory, comprising the Antarctic Peninsula with the sector extending to the South Pole, the South Shetland Islands and the South Orkney Islands, was formed and became its own separate territory in 1962 with the enactment of the British Antarctic Territory Order in Council 1962.

The British Antarctic Territory Order 1989, enacted by the Privy Council in May 1989, provides for a head of government in the territory, known as the Commissioner for the British Antarctic Territory. The Commissioner can make laws, known as ordinances, covering different aspects of life in the territory, including the judicial system, tax, the allocation of public funds, the environment and marriage. Concerning matters not covered by local legislation, the law in force in England and Wales shall be applied in the territory, in accordance with the Administration of Justice Ordinance 1990.

Same-sex marriage law
In July 2016, Commissioner Peter Hayes published a draft of a new marriage ordinance to repeal the Marriage Ordinance 1990. In a report explaining the reasons for the new ordinance, the Foreign and Commonwealth Office wrote that it "imports provisions from the law in England in relation to the capacity to marry and the requirements for consent. It is this provision, together with other reformed sections that would allow persons of the same sex to get married in the Territory." Same-sex marriage has been legal in England and Wales since 13 March 2014, following the enactment of the Marriage (Same Sex Couples) Act 2013, which received royal assent by Her Majesty Queen Elizabeth II on 17 July 2013.

The draft was under consultation between 2 August and 30 September 2016. The ordinance was proclaimed by Commissioner Hayes on 13 October 2016 and took effect forthwith. Along with reformed sections permitting same-sex couples to marry, the changes make it easier for marriages to be arranged in the territory. Marriages are solemnised by marriage officers, who are appointed by the Commissioner, at "any place that the marriage officer considers suitable", either within the territory or on board a ship within territorial waters. If the intending spouses are British citizens, the marriage will be legally recognised in the UK.

The first same-sex marriage in the territory took place on 24 April 2022 between Eric Bourne and Stephen Carpenter on board RRS Sir David Attenborough near the Rothera Research Station on Adelaide Island.

See also
 Same-sex marriage in the United Kingdom
 Recognition of same-sex unions in the British Overseas Territories

References

British Antarctic Territory
2016 in LGBT history
British Antarctic Territory